Gravity Probe may refer to:

 Gravity Probe A
 Gravity Probe B

de:Gravity Probe